Daniel H. Pink (born July 23, 1964) is an American author. He has written seven books; five of them are New York Times bestsellers. He was a host and a co-executive producer of the National Geographic Channel social science TV series Crowd Control. From 1995 to 1997, he was the chief speechwriter for Vice President Al Gore.

Early life and education
Pink grew up in Columbus, Ohio and graduated from Bexley High School in 1982. He is also a 1986 Phi Beta Kappa graduate of Northwestern University where he was a Truman Scholar. He received a Juris Doctor degree from Yale Law School, where he was editor-in-chief of the Yale Law & Policy Review.

Upon graduating law school, Pink immediately began working in politics and economic policy. From 1993 to 1995, he was special assistant to Secretary of Labor Robert Reich. From 1995 to 1997, he worked as the chief speechwriter for Vice President Al Gore. In 1997 he quit his job going out on his own, an experience he described in the 1998 Fast Company article "Free Agent Nation" which became his first book.

Honors and awards
Pink has received honorary degrees from Georgetown University, Pratt Institute, Ringling College of Art and Design, and the University of Indianapolis.

Pink’s books have been selected as common reads for first-year students at George Washington University, Butler University, Texas State University, and other colleges. In addition, Oprah Winfrey gifted copies of his book, A Whole New Mind, to 4,500 graduates of Stanford University when she gave the school’s commencement address.

Books

 NYT Hardcover Nonfiction bestseller No. 12, December 28, 2008.

 NYT Hardcover Nonfiction bestseller No. 12, March 7, 2010.
 NYT Hardcover Nonfiction bestseller No. 8, February 10, 2013.
 NYT Hardcover Nonfiction bestseller No. 2, January 28, 2018.
 The Power of Regret: How Looking Backward Moves Us Forward (2022). Retrieved 29 February 2022. Riverhead. ISBN 978-0-7352-1065-3 NYT Hardcover Nonfiction bestseller No. 3, February 20, 2022

References

External links

1964 births
Living people
American business writers
American male journalists
American speechwriters
Bexley High School alumni
Northwestern University alumni
Yale Law School alumni